Kavus Mirza was the self-declared Shah of Shirvan in exile after the downfall of Gasim Mirza.

Life 
He was member of the Shirvanshahs and was the nephew of Burhan Ali.  He invaded Shirvan from Dagestan in 1577/8, but was defeated near Shabran. His fate is unknown.

References 

Year of birth unknown
16th-century Iranian military personnel